Ryan Thomerson (born 1 October 1994) is an Australian professional snooker player.

Thomerson turned professional in 2022 after winning the Asia Pacific Championship and gained a two-year tour card for the 2022–23 and 2023–24 snooker seasons.

Performance and rankings timeline

Career finals

Amateur finals: 6 (2 titles)

References

External links
 Ryan Thomerson at wst.tv
 Ryan Thomerson at WPBSA snookerscores.net

Australian snooker players
1994 births
Living people